In Greek mythology, Hipponous (Ancient Greek: Ἱππόνοος) referred to several people:

Hipponous, the Olenian father of Capaneus and Periboea by Astynome. He was son of Iocles, grandson of Astacus and great-grandson of Hermes and Astabe, a daughter of Peneus.
Hipponous, one of the fifty sons of Priam, the last Trojan whom Achilles killed before his death.
Hipponous, an Achaean warrior killed by Hector.
Hipponous, son of Triballus. He was the father of Polyphonte by Thrassa, the daughter of Ares and Tereine.
Hipponous, who together with his father, son of Adrastus, were said to have thrown themselves into fire in obedience to an oracle of Apollo.
Hipponous, the birth name of Bellerophon.

Notes

References 

 Antoninus Liberalis, The Metamorphoses of Antoninus Liberalis translated by Francis Celoria (Routledge 1992). Online version at the Topos Text Project.
 Gaius Julius Hyginus, Fabulae from The Myths of Hyginus translated and edited by Mary Grant. University of Kansas Publications in Humanistic Studies. Online version at the Topos Text Project.
 Homer, The Iliad with an English Translation by A.T. Murray, Ph.D. in two volumes. Cambridge, MA., Harvard University Press; London, William Heinemann, Ltd. 1924. Online version at the Perseus Digital Library.
 Homer, Homeri Opera in five volumes. Oxford, Oxford University Press. 1920. Greek text available at the Perseus Digital Library.
 Pindar, Odes translated by Diane Arnson Svarlien. 1990. Online version at the Perseus Digital Library.
 Pindar, The Odes of Pindar including the Principal Fragments with an Introduction and an English Translation by Sir John Sandys, Litt.D., FBA. Cambridge, MA., Harvard University Press; London, William Heinemann Ltd. 1937. Greek text available at the Perseus Digital Library.
 Pseudo-Apollodorus, The Library with an English Translation by Sir James George Frazer, F.B.A., F.R.S. in 2 Volumes, Cambridge, MA, Harvard University Press; London, William Heinemann Ltd. 1921. Online version at the Perseus Digital Library. Greek text available from the same website.
 Quintus Smyrnaeus, The Fall of Troy translated by Way. A. S. Loeb Classical Library Volume 19. London: William Heinemann, 1913. Online version at theio.com
 Quintus Smyrnaeus, The Fall of Troy. Arthur S. Way. London: William Heinemann; New York: G.P. Putnam's Sons. 1913. Greek text available at the Perseus Digital Library.

Achaeans (Homer)
Trojans
Children of Priam
Princes in Greek mythology

Aetolian characters in Greek mythology
Suicides in Greek mythology